Annerley Road is an arterial road in Brisbane, Queensland, Australia. It was formerly known as Boggo Road due to the boggy condition of the road.

Route

Annerley Road commences at Stanley Street at Clarence Corner. It passes through or forms the border of the suburbs of:
 South Brisbane
 Woolloongabba
 Dutton Park
 Fairfield
 Annerley
It terminates at Ipswich Road at the Annerley Junction.

Landmarks

Annerley Road has many well-known landmarks including:

 Clarence Corner
 Clarence Corner Hotel, on south-east corner of Stanley Street
 Princess Theatre, a heritage-listed theatre, No 8
 Mater Hospital Complex, on south-west corner of Stanley Street:
 Bethany Gospel Hall, No 38 
 Burke's Hotel (now Red Brick Hotel), No 83 
 Dutton Park State School, No 112

 Boggo Road Gaol heritage-listed former prison, No 150
 Gair Park with the Dutton Park War Memorial, No 181
 South Brisbane Cemetery
 Dutton Park railway station
 Heffernan Park with its heritage-listed air raid shelter, No 260
 Ingleside, the heritage-listed residence of former Queensland Premier Digby Denham, No 391
 Annerley Junction

References

Further reading
 

Roads in Brisbane
South Brisbane, Queensland
Woolloongabba
Annerley, Queensland
Dutton Park, Queensland